Andrea Millet was an Italian luger who competed in the late 1970s. A natural track luger, he won a gold medal in the men's doubles event at the 1979 FIL World Luge Natural Track Championships in Inzing, Austria.

Millet also won two medals at the 1979 FIL European Luge Natural Track Championships in Aosta, Italy with a silver in the doubles and a bronze in the singles.

References
Natural track European Championships results 1970-2006.
Natural track World Championships results: 1979-2007

Italian male lugers
Possibly living people
Year of birth missing